Irdomyrmex breviantennis is an extinct species of ant which belongs to the genus Iridomyrmex. The first fossils was officially described by Théobald in 1937. A fossil of a queen was observed from Kleinkems in Efringen-Kirchen in Bade-Wurtemberg.

References

†
Fossil taxa described in 1937
Fossil ant taxa
Fossils of France
 01